Robert Henry Metge  (1850 – 19 September 1900) was an Irish Home Rule League politician. He was born in Athlumney, Co Meath, the  son of John Charles Metge and Eliza Ibbetson Cole of Navan, Co Meath.

A barrister, he was elected as a Member of Parliament (MP) for Meath in 1880, but resigned the seat on 30 July 1883.

His first marriage was in 1874 to Frances Thomasine Virginia Lambart, with whom he had thirteen children; his second wife Lillian Margaret Metge was a leading suffragette, with whom he had two daughters. After his premature death, she was arrested for causing an explosion, damaging the Cathedral in Lisburn. 

Robert Metge died in Kingstown, Co Dublin on 19 September 1900.

References

External links
 

UK MPs 1880–1885
1850 births
1900 deaths
Home Rule League MPs
Members of the Parliament of the United Kingdom for County Meath constituencies (1801–1922)
Irish suffragettes